"A Tree Grows in Springfield" is the sixth episode of the twenty-fourth season of the American animated television series The Simpsons. It originally aired on the Fox network in the United States on November 25, 2012, and was seen by around 7.46 million people during this broadcast.

Plot
Homer is heavily depressed over his life, and Lisa decides to cheer him up by purchasing a raffle ticket at fundraiser at Springfield Elementary School. Homer wins a MyPad and soon becomes obsessed with it until he falls and breaks it. The Simpsons make their backyard tree grow. Feeling even more depressed, Homer feels hopeless until Ned Flanders makes a discovery, finding the word "Hope" written on the Simpsons' backyard tree in sap. The people watch the tree grow. Everyone, especially Homer, sees it as a miracle. However, reporter Kent Brockman, determined to expose the truth and shatter everyone's hopes, finds a thermal video that shows someone wandering onto the Simpsons' backyard and writing "Hope" onto the tree with maple syrup. Homer is distraught once again until Marge reassures him that since someone wrote the word on the tree, it meant that someone was watching and that the message was for him when he really needed it. Homer agrees and goes back into the house with her. The following night, someone approaches the backyard tree and continues writing "Hope" onto the tree. It is revealed to be a sleepwalking Homer.

The episode ends with a vignette inspired by the French animated short film Logorama.

Reception

Ratings
The episode was watched by a total of 7.46 million viewers and received a 3.3 in the 18-49 demographic making it the most watched show on Animation Domination that night in terms of total viewers and the 18-49 demographic.

Critical reception
Robert David Sullivan from The A.V. Club gave the episode a B−, saying "'A Tree Grows In Springfield' turns out to be a throwback to early Simpsons in a season that’s been heavy on mean-spirited humor."

Stephanie Gillis received an Annie nomination for Writing in a Television Production.

References

External links 
 
 "A Tree Grows in Springfield" at theSimpsons.com

The Simpsons (season 24) episodes
2012 American television episodes